Mike Kingsley (born December 31, 1959) is an American politician serving as a member of the Idaho House of Representatives from the 6B district. Elected in November 2016, he assumed office on December 1, 2016.

Early life and career 
Born in Lewiston, Idaho, Kingsley attended Lewiston High School. He earned his radio operator license from BLT Electronic Theory in 1979.

Career 
Kingsley was unopposed in the Republican primary for the 6B district. He rain against incumbent John Rusche in the general election, winning with 58.24% of the vote. He ran unopposed in the Republican primary for the 6B district as a write-in candidate. Kingsley lost to John Rusche in the general election by 48 votes.

Kingsley along with Bryan Zollinger launched Idaho Freedom Caucus, late in the 2017 session.

In April 2017, Freedom Caucus collaborated to challenge Governor Butch Otter Veto of the Idaho grocery tax.

References

External links
Mike Kingsley at the Idaho Legislature

1959 births
Living people
People from Lewiston, Idaho
Republican Party members of the Idaho House of Representatives
21st-century American politicians